Vino Volo (Italian for "wine flight") is a food and wine bar with a boutique wine shop. A San Francisco-based company, Vino Volo was founded in 2004 by Doug Tomlinson. Vino Volo sells wines from around the world by the bottle, glass, or in tasting flights. Additionally, they sell a variety of food options to eat at the store, or "to go". Vino Volo offers a wine club for enthusiasts and a loyalty program to rewards its guests.  The company operates mainly in airport locations across the US and Canada.

History and locations
The first Vino Volo location was established in September, 2005 at Washington DC’s Dulles International Airport and later expanded 39 locations in airports across North America, 4 Canadian locations (Vancouver and Montreal) and one city store in Bethesda, MD.

Stores in Austin–Bergstrom International Airport (AUS) and Jacksonville International Airport (JAX) opened in Spring 2014.

Awards
Vino Volo has won 25 "Airport Revenue News" awards, including " Food Operator with Highest Regard for Customer Service" seven years in a row. In addition, Vino Volo was named the Best Airport Wine Bar at the 2nd Airport Food & Beverage awards.

References

External links
Vino Volo website

Wine bars
Drink companies of the United States
Companies based in San Francisco
Food and drink in the San Francisco Bay Area
Restaurants in California
Drink companies based in California